Throughout the history of football in Madeira a rivalry thrived between the so-called "big three". This rivalry is mainly marked by the predominance of Marítimo over Nacional and União.

Derby results

Overall

Marítimo vs Nacional

League

Taça de Portugal

Marítimo vs União

League

Taça da Liga

Nacional vs União

League

Titles

First Team 
Official competitions common to the three clubs and the number of titles won by each club.

Youth Teams 
List of the official competitions common to the three clubs throughout history and the number of titles won by each club.

» NOTES
 As of 8 July 2021
 União never competed in the European competitions.
 Marítimo never competed in the third tier.
 Attendances taken from http://www.thefinalball.com

References

Marítimo vs. Nacional vs. União